Emil Justitz (1878–1932) was an Austrian film director and producer of the silent era.

Selected filmography
 Martyr of His Heart (1918)
 Maria Pavlowna (1919)
 The Red Poster (1920)
 The Hustler (1920)
 Demon Circus (1923)
 The Stolen Professor (1924)
 Poor as a Church Mouse (dir. Richard Oswald, 1931)

References

Bibliography
 Grange, William. Cultural Chronicle of the Weimar Republic. Scarecrow Press, 2008.

External links

1878 births
1932 deaths
Austrian film directors
Film people from Vienna